= African Spirit =

Supply vessel built in 1983

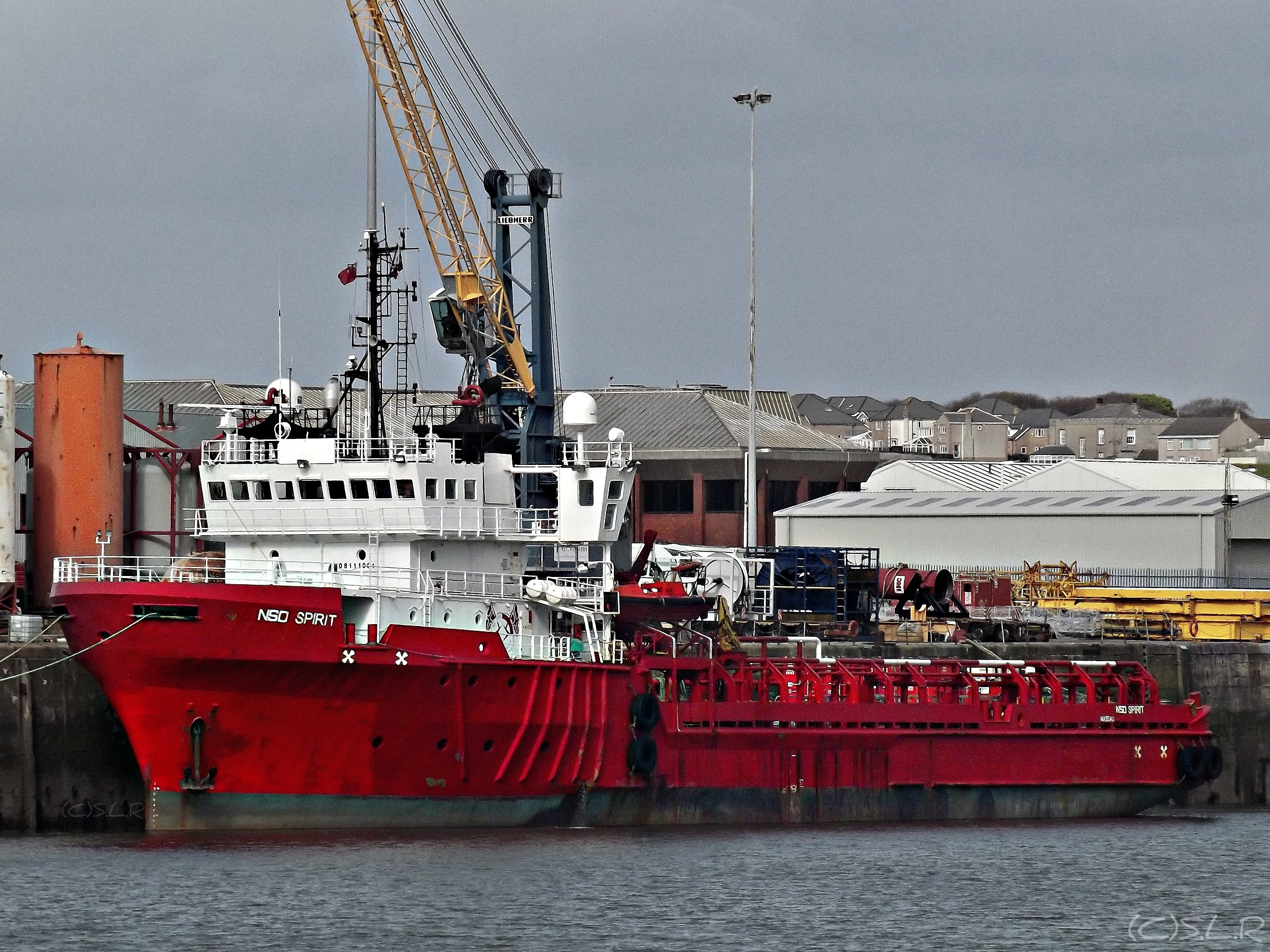

History
- Name: African Spirit
- Owner: GOSL Nigeria Ltd
- Port of registry: Nigeria
- Builder: Ulstein Hatlø A/S
- Laid down: 1981
- Launched: 1982
- Completed: 1983
- Identification: Call sign: C6ZH5; IMO number: 8111001; MMSI no.: 311055600
- Status: In service

General characteristics
- Class & type: PSV
- Tonnage: 2,169 GT
- Length: 69 m (226 ft 5 in)
- Beam: 17 m (55 ft 9 in)
- Draught: 4 m (13 ft 1 in)
- Speed: 10 knots (19 km/h; 12 mph) (max)

MV African Spirit is a supply vessel formerly named NSO Spirit, Ocean Spirit, Stad Spirit, Loch Shuna, and Far Spirit. The vessel was built in 1983 at Molde Verft AS.
